The 2009 Supersport World Championship was the eleventh FIM Supersport World Championship season—the thirteenth taking into account the two held under the name of Supersport World Series. The season started on 1 March at Phillip Island and finished on 25 October at Portimão after 14 rounds. The championship supported the Superbike World Championship at every round.

Despite a win at the final round for Eugene Laverty, a fourth-place finish by Cal Crutchlow won him the championship by seven points over the Irish rider.

Race calendar and results
The provisional race schedule was circulated among the teams in October 2008, and was made official by FIM at the following General Assembly.

Championship standings

Riders' standings

Manufacturers' standings

Entry list
The entry list was made official on 15 January 2009.

All entries used Pirelli tyres.

References

External links

Supersport
Supersport World Championship seasons
World
World
World